The Lazio regional election of 1970 took place on 7–8 June 1970.

Events
Christian Democracy resulted the largest party, followed by the Italian Communist Party. After the election Christian Democrat Girolamo Mechelli formed a centre-left government which included the Italian Socialist Party, the Unitary Socialist Party and the Italian Republican Party (organic Centre-left). In 1972 Mechelli was replaced by fellow Christian Democrat Luigi Cipriani, to whom Rinaldo Santini succeeded in 1973.

Results

Source: Ministry of the Interior

Elections in Lazio
1970 elections in Italy